Walnut Township is a township in Dallas County, Iowa, USA.  As of the 2000 census, its population was 8,074.

Geography
According to the USGS, it contains two cemeteries: Hoff and Waukee.

The stream of Little Walnut Creek runs through this township.

Transportation
Walnut Township contains one airport or landing strip, Robel Field.

References
 USGS Geographic Names Information System (GNIS)

External links
 US-Counties.com
 City-Data.com

Townships in Dallas County, Iowa
Townships in Iowa